William Satterlee Griffiths (26 June 1922 – 27 October 2010) was a British field hockey player who competed in the 1948 Summer Olympics. He was a member of the British field hockey team, which won the silver medal. He played all five matches as forward.

Griffiths was President of Abergavenny Hockey Club from 1967 to 2007, for 40 of the club's 110 years existence. He was about 14 years of age when he started to play hockey. He was to represent Great Britain on 8 occasions and was the holder of an Olympic silver medal that he won at the 1948 London Olympic Games when Great Britain came second to gold medallists India in the final. He played in all the matches of that campaign. His GB caps were awarded against Switzerland, the United States, Pakistan, India, Holland (twice), France, and Afghanistan.

Whilst a student at Cambridge University Griffiths was awarded a hockey blue. When World War II came he joined the Royal Air Force and was posted to South Africa where he continued to play hockey and became a PT instructor. On returning to Wales and to Cardiff University to complete his medical studies he played hockey for Newport Athletic and joined Abergavenny in 1950.

By then Griffiths had already accumulated 10 Welsh international caps, the first of which was in 1947 against Ireland. In total he played 32 times for Wales and ended his international career in 1956 when he travelled to Amsterdam to play Holland. Two of those 32 international games were played at Abergavenny Cricket Club – against England in 1949 and Ireland in 1954.

Griffiths was a forward thinking player in his heyday. At the 1948 Olympic Games all teams except India played with broad English head sticks. India used short rounded head sticks similar to those that we use today. Griffiths tried to convince players that the Indian head was the only way forward but to no avail. The English head was still being used in the 1952 Olympics.

Griffith's specialty was the reverse stick cross from the left wing, which was reasonably easy to achieve with an Indian head stick but difficult with the cumbersome English head.

The club celebrated Bill's 40 years of Presidency on 21 November 2007 and the incoming President, Trevor Scott thanked Bill for his unfailing interest and support during all of that time: "We have been very, very fortunate to have had such a distinguished sportsman and gentleman to be our President. It will be a hard act to follow".

Chairman Paul Harrington, President Trevor Scott and current player Michael Potts made the presentation of an engraved sundial to Griffiths. Potts is Bill's Grandson, following the family tradition.

References

External links
 
profile

1922 births
2010 deaths
Welsh male field hockey players
Olympic field hockey players of Great Britain
British male field hockey players
Field hockey players at the 1948 Summer Olympics
Olympic silver medallists for Great Britain
Royal Air Force Physical Training instructors
Royal Air Force personnel of World War II
Olympic medalists in field hockey
Welsh Olympic medallists
Medalists at the 1948 Summer Olympics
Alumni of the University of Cambridge
British expatriates in South Africa